George Montgomerie (30 August 1712 – 26 March 1766) was a British Member of Parliament. 

He was born the eldest son of George Montgomerie of Horndon-on-the-Hill, Essex and educated at Eton College (1728-31), the Middle Temple (1731) and St. John’s College, Cambridge (1732). 

He served as a Yellow (Whig (MP) for Ipswich between 20 November 1759 and 27 March 1761.. He was also the High Sheriff of Cambridgeshire and Huntingdonshire for 1759–60.

He died in 1766. He had married Catherine, the daughter of Jacob Sawbridge, MP and had one daughter, who married Crisp Molineux, MP.

References

1712 births
1766 deaths
People from Horndon-on-the-Hill
People educated at Eton College
Members of the Middle Temple
Alumni of St John's College, Cambridge
Members of the Parliament of Great Britain for Ipswich
British MPs 1754–1761
High Sheriffs of Cambridgeshire and Huntingdonshire
Whig (British political party) MPs for English constituencies